Zane Schwenk (born July 17, 1975, in Sarasota, Florida, USA) is a professional Wakeboarder. He now lives in Winter Haven, Florida. He started professional wakeboarding in 1993 and is still active in the sport today. 2008 marked his 15th year as a Professional, he has also competed in the X Games. He is host of the MasterCraft Video series Rewind. Schwenk also has his own line of CWB wakeboards, the Absolute.
Schwenk's sponsors include: CWB Wakeboards, Proline Ropes & Handles, MasterCraft Boats, Spy Optics, Rusty Clothing.

Signature tricks
 Discombobulator: A wrapped Heelside Backroll with a frontside 540  – invented back in the ski jumping days by Dave "Tha  Dawg" Reinhart. First landed on a wakeboard by Zane Schwenk.
 Slurpy: Rider approached the wake with both hands behind back and performs a toeside backroll with a backside 360 –  Invented by Zane Schwenk.

Career highlights

1992 & 1993 Amateur Season
1992 Florida State Freestyle Jumping Champion
1993 Florida State Freestyle Jumping Champion

1994 Budweiser Water Ski Pro Tour
1st-Freestyle Jumping, St. Paul, MN, Pro Tour
2nd-Freestyle Jumping, Phoenix, AZ, Pro Tour
2nd-Freestyle Jumping, Indianapolis, IN, Pro Tour
2nd-Freestyle Jumping, American Professional Freestyle Tournament
2nd-Wakeboarding, St. Louis, MO, Pro Tour
Freestyle Jump Overall Ranked 2nd

1995 Budweiser Water Ski Pro Tour
1st-Freestyle Jumping, Hartford, CT, Pro Tour
1st-Freestyle Jumping, Seattle, WA, Pro Tour
2nd-Freestyle Jumping, Orlando, FL, Pro Tour
2nd-Freestyle Jumping, Highpoint, NC, Pro Tour
2nd-Freestyle Jumping, Shreveport, LA, Pro Tour
2nd-Freestyle Jumping, Philadelphia, PA, Pro Tour
2nd-Freestyle Jumping, Detroit, MI, Pro Tour
2nd-Freestyle Jumping, Indianapolis, IN, Pro Tour
2nd-Freestyle Jumping, St. Paul, MN, Pro Tour
2nd-Freestyle Jumping, Portland, OR, Pro Tour
2nd-Wakeboarding, Portland, OR, Pro Tour
3rd-Wakeboarding, Highpoint, NC, Pro Tour
3rd-Wakeboarding, Philadelphia, PA, Pro Tour
3rd-Wakeboarding, Hartford, CT, Pro Tour
Freestyle Jump Overall Ranked 2nd
Wakeboarding Overall Ranked 3rd

1996 Sea Doo Wakeboard Pro Tour
1st-Expression Session, Shreveport, LA Pro Tour
1st-Expression Session, Indianapolis, IN Pro Tour
1st-Expression Session, Marine World Invitational
1st-Expression Session, Pacific Wakeboard Challenge
1st- Freestyle Session, Pacific Wakeboard Challenge
1st-Expression Session, Board Stock, Shasta, CA
2nd-Expression Session, Hartford, CT Pro Tour
2nd-Expression Session, Omaha, NE Pro Tour
2nd-Freestyle Session, Shreveport, LA Pro Tour
2nd-Freestyle Jumping, Marine World Invitational
Pacific Wakeboard Challenge Overall Champion
International Cup Expression Session Ranked 2nd
International Cup Freestyle Session Ranked 4th
X Games Competitor
Masters Invitational Competitor
1998 Wakeboard World Cup
1st-Free Ride, Portland, OR Pro Tour
1st-Free Ride, Australian Xtreme Games
2nd-Big Air, Australian Xtreme Games
2nd-Free Ride, ESPN X Trails
2nd-Free Ride, Masters Challenge
3rd-Free Ride, ESPN X Games
3rd-Free Ride, U.S. Masters Invitational
3rd-Free Ride, FISE French Extreme Games
4th-Free Ride, Vancouver, B.C. Pro Tour
7th-Free Ride, Wakeboard Worlds
World Cup Ranked 7th

1999 Wakeboard World Cup
  1st-Overall, World's Greatest Skier Tournament
 1st-Free Ride, FISE French Extreme Games
 1st-Free Ride, ESPN X Trials
 2nd-Free Ride, Australian Xtreme Games
 2nd-Free Ride, Atlanta Pro Tour
 2nd-Free Ride, US Open
2nd-Big Air, England World Cup
 4th-Free Ride, Portland, OR Pro Tour
5th-Free Ride, Berlin World Cup
 6th-Free Ride, U.S. Masters Invitational
   Pro Tour Ranking-5th
 World Cup Ranking-6th

2000 Wakeboard World Cup
 1st-Overall, Inaugural America's Cup Tournament
  2nd-Free Ride, WWA World Championship
  2nd-Big Air Ramp, WWA World Championships
 5th-Free Ride, Oklahoma City, OK Pro Tour
6th-Van's Triple Crown Ranking
X Games Competitor
 Gravity Games Competitor

2001 Wakeboard World Cup
 1st Ft. Lauderdale Big Air Slider Event
   2nd Free Ride, Australian World Xtreme Games
2nd Big Air Slider, Australian World Xtreme Games
 2nd Vancouver Pro Tour Stop, Free Ride
 3rd Ft. Lauderdale Pro Tour Stop, Free Ride
3rd WWA US Nationals Orlando, FL
 4th Detroit Pro Tour Stop, Free Ride
5th X Games Philadelphia, PA
 6th Gravity Games Providence, RI
Ranked 6th on the World Cup
  Ranked 6th on the Vans Triple Crown
Ranked 7th on the US Pro Tour

2004 WWA World Series
5th Rio World Series
  Injured Mid Season
 Introduction of the MasterCraft X Star a 2 ½ year project I worked on.

2005-06 Injury Recovery
Traveled to each stop promoting MasterCraft and CWB Wakeboards as well as handling PR for event and team athletes on site. He continued to work in the design process with both MasterCraft and CWB helping to develop the 2006 Innovation of the Year Hinge Technology.

2007 Wakeboard World Series
 9th (Tie) Dallas PWT
 25th PWT Ranking
 25th King Of Wake Ranking
11th Pan Am  Games Qualifier
  13th Board Up Miami Event
   10th Anniversary “Zane” pro model is released
 10th Anniversary PWT Edition X Star released with signature on boat

2008 Pro Wakeboard Tour & World Series
11th Phoenix Pro Wakeboard Tour (tied)
Finished 22 for 08 PWT Season
Top 40 on World Series
Wakeboard Magazine “Legend” Award

Side Notes:
Wakeboard Magazine Legend Award 2008
Featured Athlete Standard Magazine 2008
2001 – 1st Ft. Lauderdale Big Air Slider Event
2000 – 1st-Overall, Inaugural America's Cup Tournament
1999 – 1st-Overall, World's Greatest Skier Tournament
1999 – 1st-Free Ride, FISE French Extreme Games
1999 – 1st-Free Ride, ESPN X Trials
1998 – 1st-Free Ride, Portland, OR Pro Tour
1998 – 1st-Free Ride, Australian Xtreme Games
1996 – 1st-Expression Session, Shreveport, LA Pro Tour
1996 – 1st-Expression Session, Indianapolis, IN Pro Tour
1996 – 1st-Expression Session, Marine World Invitational
1996 – 1st-Expression Session, Pacific Wakeboard Challenge
1996 – 1st- Freestyle Session, Pacific Wakeboard Challenge
1996 – 1st-Expression Session, Board Stock, Shasta, CA
1996 – Pacific Wakeboard Challenge Overall Champion
Former Wakeboard World Record Holder
Cover, Wakeboarding Magazine (December 1996)

Accomplishments
1999 World's Greatest Skier Champion, an event similar to a decathlon on the 	water.
1998 “Comeback of the Year” Award
Former Wakeboard World Record Holder
Freestyle Jumping World & Pro Tour Record Holder
First and only to perform a double front flip freestyle jumping.
1994-1995 set over fifteen Pro Tour records.
Covers of Water Ski Magazine (April 1995, February 1996), Wakeboarding Magazine (December 1996)
Filmed Cherry Coke commercial (July 1997).
Screen Actors Guild Member.
World Wakeboarding Association-USA Board Member
Inventor of numerous wakeboarding maneuvers.
2003 Largest Sales Increase Award-CWB/Connelly

References

External links
 Athlete biography at MasterCraft
 Athlete biography at EXPN
 Wakeboarding Inverts list at WakeBoarder

Living people
American wakeboarders
1975 births